Hulgur  is a village in the southern state of Karnataka, India. It is located in the Shiggaon taluk of Haveri district in Karnataka.

Demographics
As of 2001 India census, Hulgur had a population of 8092 with 4094 males and 3998 females.

See also
 Haveri
 Districts of Karnataka

References

External links
 http://Haveri.nic.in/
 http://wikimapia.org/#lang=en&lat=15.087331&lon=75.277247&z=19&m=b&show=/33620859/HAZRATH-SAYED-HAZRATHSHA-QADRI-(RH)-رحمة-الله-عليه
 http://wikimapia.org/#lang=en&lat=15.087704&lon=75.284586&z=14&m=b&show=/628296/Hulgur&search=hulgur

Villages in Haveri district